The First Amendment of the Constitution Act 1939 amended the Constitution of Ireland to extend the constitutional definition of "time of war" to include a period during which a war occurs without the state itself being a direct participant. It was introduced and signed into law on 2 September 1939, the day after the Invasion of Poland by Germany and allowed the government to exercise emergency powers during World War II (known in Ireland as The Emergency) although the state was neutral.

Background
Article 28.3.3° of the Constitution grants the state sweeping powers during a state of emergency, but in the form in which the article was adopted in 1937, they could be invoked only during a "time of war or armed rebellion". The First Amendment specified that "time of war" could include an armed conflict in which the state was not actually taking part.

The amendment was introduced by the Fianna Fáil government of Éamon de Valera on 2 September 1939, and passed swiftly through both houses of the Oireachtas. Unlike later amendments, the First and Second Amendments were not submitted to a referendum because under the terms of Article 51, one of the Transitory Provisions of the Constitution, the Constitution could be amended by a vote of the Oireachtas alone from 1938 to 1941.

Changes to the text
Addition of the text in bold to Article 28.3.3º:

Irish text
The First Amendment was passed only in English. That created a constitutional difficulty, as the Irish text of the Constitution has legal precedence. The error was rectified by the Second Amendment, passed in 1941, which included in its provisions, at Reference No. 21, the Irish text of the First Amendment.

Legislation
The Emergency Powers Act 1939 was passed and signed on the same day as the First Amendment. Further Acts were passed over the course of World War II. The Emergency Powers Act 1976 was passed in response to The Troubles.

Later amendments
Article 28.3.3º was amended on two further occasions. The Second Amendment, passed in 1941, also under Article 51, clarified that emergency provisions must be within the time of war or armed rebellion itself and added a clause at the end of the last sentence, which specified that a "time of war" could extend beyond the termination of hostilities. The Twenty-first Amendment, passed in 2001, prohibited the use of the death penalty in a new subsection in Article 15.5.2º, and provided that the emergency provisions of the Constitution could not be used to allow the death penalty. Those later changes are highlighted in bold:

See also
State of Emergency
Politics of the Republic of Ireland
History of the Republic of Ireland

References

Oireachtas debates

First Amendment of the Constitution Bill 1939 on the Oireachtas Beta website

Legislation
First Amendment of the Constitution Act 1939
Full text of the Constitution of Ireland
Emergency Powers Act 1939
Emergency Powers (Amendment) Act 1940
Emergency Powers (Amendment) (No. 2) Act 1940
Emergency Powers (Continuance) Act 1940
Emergency Powers (Continuance) Act 1941
Emergency Powers (Continuance and Amendment) Act 1942
Emergency Powers (Continuance) Act 1943
Emergency Powers (Continuance) Act 1944
Emergency Powers (Continuance and Amendment) Act 1945
Emergency Powers Act 1976

1939 in Irish law
1939 in Irish politics
01
Independent Ireland in World War II
September 1939 events